Pollenia bicolor is a species of cluster fly in the family Polleniidae.

Distribution
Andorra, France, Morocco, Portugal, Spain.

References

Polleniidae
Insects described in 1830
Diptera of Europe
Diptera of Africa
Taxa named by Jean-Baptiste Robineau-Desvoidy